Kramgoa låtar 1997 is a 1997 Vikingarna studio album, released as CD and cassette tape. The album's major hit song, "Du gav mej ljusa minnen", charted at Svensktoppen for five weeks. The album sold platinum in Sweden, gold in Norway, and totally 160 000 copies throughout the Nordic region.

Track listing
Små nära ting
Samma tid samma plats
Du gav mej ljusa minnen
Good Luck Charm
Var det någnting som jag sa
Min barndomstid
I en roddbåt till Kina (On a slow boat to China)
I en roddbåt till Kina
Sån't rår inte åren på
Jag vill ha dej mer
En enkel sång om kärlek
Ingenting
Inga stora bevingade ord
Adios amigo

Charts

References 

1997 albums
Vikingarna (band) albums
Swedish-language albums